The 44th running of the Tour of Flanders cycling classic was held on Sunday, 3 April 1960. Arthur De Cabooter won the race in the sprint of a group of 16 ahead of Jean Graczyk and Rik Van Looy. 72 of 164 riders finished.

Route
The race started in Ghent and finished in Wetteren – totaling 227 km. The course featured five categorized climbs:
 Kwaremont
 Kruisberg
 Varent
 Valkenberg
 Kloosterstraat

Results

References

Tour of Flanders
1960 in road cycling
1960 in Belgian sport
1960 Super Prestige Pernod